Artyom Anatolyevich Fyodorov (born 16 December 1984) is a Russian professional football player. He plays for FC Sokol Saratov.

Club career
He made his Russian Football National League debut for FC Sokol Saratov on 6 July 2014 in a game against FC Yenisey Krasnoyarsk.

External links
 
 

1984 births
Sportspeople from Saratov
Living people
Russian footballers
Association football goalkeepers
FC Sokol Saratov players
FC Fakel Voronezh players